The 2023 NCAA Division II men's basketball tournament will be the single-elimination tournament to determine the annual national champion of men's NCAA Division II college basketball in the United States.

The championship rounds will be held from March 21–25, 2023 at the Ford Center in Evansville, Indiana.

Tournament schedule and venues

Regionals
First, second, and third-round games (the last of which doubles as a regional championship), will take place on campus sites from March 11–14, 2023. The top-seeded team in each regional serves as host.

Elite Eight
The national quarterfinals quarterfinals, semifinals, and finals will be held at a predetermined site, the Ford Center in Evansville, Indiana, from March 21–25, 2023.

Qualifying
A total of sixty-four bids are available for the tournament: 23 automatic bids (awarded to the champions of the twenty-three Division II conferences) and 41 at-large bids.

The bids are allocated evenly among the eight NCAA-designated regions (Atlantic, Central, East, Midwest, South, South Central, Southeast, and West), each of which contains either two or three of the twenty-three Division II conferences that sponsor men's basketball. Each region consists of two or three automatic qualifiers (the teams who won their respective conference tournaments) and either five or six at-large bids, awarded regardless of conference affiliation.

Automatic bids (23)

At-large bids (41)

Regionals

Atlantic
 Site: Indiana, Pennsylvania (Indiana (PA))

Central
 Site: Maryville, Missouri (NW Missouri State)

* – Denotes overtime period

East
 Site: Manchester, New Hampshire (St. Anselm)

Midwest
 Site: Indianapolis, Indiana (Indianapolis)

South
 Site: Davie, Florida (Nova Southeastern)

South Central
 Site: Canyon, Texas (West Texas A&M)

Southeast
 Site: Augusta, Georgia (Augusta)

West
 Site: San Diego, California (Point Loma)

* – Denotes overtime period

Elite Eight
Site: Ford Center, Evansville, Indiana

See also 
 2023 NCAA Division II women's basketball tournament
 2023 NCAA Division I men's basketball tournament
 2023 NCAA Division III men's basketball tournament
 2023 NAIA men's basketball tournament

References 

Tournament
NCAA Division II men's basketball tournament
NCAA Division II basketball tournament